"Party Bass" is a song recorded by Australian DJ vocal and producer duo Bombs Away featuring The Twin. The song was released digitally in November 2012 and remixes followed. The song peaked at number 25 on the Australian ARIA Charts and was certified platinum in 2013.

At the ARIA Music Awards of 2013, the song was nominated for Song of the Year.

Track listing
Digital download
 "Party Bass" (Original Radio Edit) – 3:41 
 "Party Bass" (Original Extended) – 4:48 
 "Party Bass" (Krunk! Remix) – 5:21

Digital download (Remixes 1)
 "Party Bass" (Calvertron remix) – 5:24 
 "Party Bass" (Krunk! Remix) – 5:24 
 "Party Bass" (Uberjakd Remix) – 5:00
 "Party Bass" (Apocalypto Remix) – 5:49 
 "Party Bass" (Tenzin Remix) – 4:45
	
Digital download (Remixes 2)
 "Party Bass" (Kronic Trap remix) – 4:40 
 "Party Bass" (Science Remix) – 3:53
 "Party Bass" (Kairo Kingdom Remix) – 5:18
 "Party Bass" (Reece Low Remix) – 5:07 
 "Party Bass" (Mikael Wills Remix) – 4:45
 "Party Bass" (Komes Remix) – 5:35

Charts

Weekly charts

Year-end charts

Certification

Release history

References

2012 singles
2012 songs
Bombs Away (group) songs